Choe Hang may refer to:

Choe Hang (military official)
Choe Hang (Goryeo civil minister)
Choe Hang (Joseon civil minister)